These are the full results of the athletics competition at the 1994 Jeux de la Francophonie which took place on July 11–13, 1994, in Bondoufle, France.

Men's results

100 meters

HeatsWind:Heat 1: -0.8 m/s, Heat 2: +0.5 m/s, Heat 3: -0.9 m/s, Heat 4: +0.4 m/s, Heat 5: -1.2 m/s, Heat 6: -1.6 m/s

SemifinalsWind:Heat 1: +0.7 m/s, Heat 2: -0.8 m/s

FinalWind: +0.5 m/s

200 meters

HeatsWind:Heat 1: -0.4 m/s, Heat 2: -0.2 m/s, Heat 3: -0.7 m/s, Heat 4: -0.1 m/s, Heat 5: -1.9 m/s

SemifinalsWind:Heat 1: -0.3 m/s, Heat 2: -1.8 m/s

FinalWind: -1.7 m/s

400 meters

Heats

Semifinals

Final

800 meters

Heats

Final

1500 meters

Heats

Final

5000 meters

10,000 meters

Marathon

110 meters hurdles

HeatsWind:Heat 1: -0.5 m/s, Heat 2: +0.2 m/s, Heat 3: +0.2 m/s

FinalWind:-1.1 m/s

400 meters hurdles

Heats

Final

4 × 100 meters relay
Heats

Final

4 × 400 meters relay

20 kilometers walk

High jump

Pole vault

Long jump

Triple jump

Shot put

Discus throw

Hammer throw

Javelin throw

Decathlon

Women's results

100 meters

HeatsWind:Heat 1: -0.3 m/s, Heat 2: -0.9 m/s, Heat 3: +1.2 m/s, Heat 4: -0.6 m/s

SemifinalsWind:Heat 1: +1.1 m/s, Heat 2: +2.0 m/s

FinalWind: +1.5 m/s

200 meters

HeatsWind:Heat 1: +0.3 m/s, Heat 2: -0.3 m/s, Heat 3: -0.6 m/s, Heat 4: -0.4 m/s

FinalWind:-0.6 m/s

400 meters

Heats

Final

800 meters

Heats

Final

1500 meters

3000 meters

10,000 meters

Marathon

100 meters hurdles

HeatsWind:Heat 1: -0.6 m/s, Heat 2: +0.4 m/s, Heat 3: +0.4 m/s

FinalWind:-0.7 m/s

400 meters hurdles

Heats

Final

4 × 100 meters relay

4 × 400 meters relay

10,000 meters walk

High jump

Long jump

Triple jump

Shot put

Discus throw

Javelin throw

Heptathlon

References

Jeux de la Francophonie
1994